Alloxan, sometimes referred to as alloxan hydrate, is the name of the organic compound with the formula OC(N(H)CO)2C(OH)2. It is classified as a derivative of  pyrimidine. The anhydrous derivative OC(N(H)CO)2CO is also known, as well as a dimeric derivative.  These are some of the earliest known organic compounds. They exhibit a variety of biological activities.

History and literature
The compound was discovered by Justus von Liebig and Friedrich Wöhler. It is one of the oldest named organic compounds.  It was originally prepared in 1818 by Luigi Valentino Brugnatelli (1761-1818) and was named in 1838 by Wöhler and Liebig.  The name "Alloxan" emerged from an amalgamation of the words "allantoin" and "Oxalsäure" (oxalic acid). The alloxan model of diabetes was first described in rabbits by Dunn, Sheehan and McLetchie in 1943.  The name is derived from allantoin, a product of uric acid excreted by the fetus into the allantois, and oxaluric acid derived from oxalic acid and urea, found in urine.

Alloxan was used in the production of the purple dye murexide, discovered by Carl Wilhelm Scheele in 1776. Murexide is the product of the complex in-situ multistep reaction of alloxantin and gaseous ammonia.  Murexide results from the condensation of the unisolated intermediate uramil with alloxan, liberated during the course of the reaction.

Scheele sourced uric acid from human calculi (such as kidney stones) and called the compound lithic acid. William Prout investigated the compound in 1818 and he used boa constrictor excrement with up to 90% ammonium acid urate.

In the chapter "Nitrogen" of his memoir The Periodic Table, Primo Levi tells of his futile attempt to make alloxan for a cosmetics manufacturer who has read that it can cause permanent reddening of the lips. Levi considers the droppings of pythons as a source for uric acid for making alloxan, but he is turned down by the director of the Turin zoo because the zoo already has lucrative contracts with pharmaceutical companies, so he is obliged to use chickens as his source of uric acid. The synthesis fails, however, "and the alloxan and its resonant name remained a resonant name."

Synthesis
It was originally obtained by oxidation of uric acid by nitric acid. It is prepared by oxidation of barbituric acid by chromium trioxide.

A dimeric derivative alloxantin can be prepared by partial reduction of alloxan with hydrogen sulfide.

Biological effects
Alloxan is a toxic glucose analogue, which selectively destroys insulin-producing cells in the pancreas (that is, beta cells) when administered to rodents and many other animal species. This causes an insulin-dependent diabetes mellitus (called "alloxan diabetes") in these animals, with characteristics similar to type 1 diabetes in humans. Alloxan is selectively toxic to insulin-producing pancreatic beta cells because it preferentially accumulates in beta cells through uptake via the GLUT2 glucose transporter. Alloxan, in the presence of intracellular thiols, generates reactive oxygen species (ROS) in a cyclic reaction with its reduction product, dialuric acid. The beta cell toxic action of alloxan is initiated by free radicals formed in this redox reaction. Studies suggests that alloxan does not cause diabetes in humans. Others found a significant difference in alloxan plasma levels in children with and without diabetes Type 1.

Impact upon beta cells
Because it selectively kills the insulin-producing beta-cells found in the pancreas, alloxan is used to induce diabetes in laboratory animals. This occurs most likely because of selective uptake of the compound due to its structural similarity to glucose as well as the beta-cell's highly efficient uptake mechanism (GLUT2). In addition, alloxan has a high affinity to SH-containing cellular compounds and, as a result, reduces glutathione content. Furthermore, alloxan inhibits glucokinase, a SH-containing protein essential for insulin secretion induced by glucose.

Most studies have shown that alloxan is not toxic to the human beta-cell, even in very high doses, probably because of differing glucose uptake mechanisms in humans and rodents.

Alloxan is, however, toxic to the liver and the kidneys in high doses.

See also
 Streptozotocin

References

External links

The history and chemistry of the Murexide dye 

Pyrimidines
Lactams
Ureas
Conjugated ketones